The 1860 Birthday Honours were appointments by Queen Victoria to various orders and honours to reward and highlight good works by citizens of the British Empire. The appointments were made to celebrate the official birthday of the Queen, and were published in The London Gazette on 18 May 1860.

The recipients of honours are displayed here as they were styled before their new honour, and arranged by honour, with classes (Knight, Knight Grand Cross, etc.) and then divisions (Military, Civil, etc.) as appropriate.

United Kingdom and British Empire

The Most Honourable Order of the Bath

Knight Grand Cross of the Order of the Bath (GCB)

Military Division
Royal Navy
Admiral of the Fleet Sir John West 
Admiral Sir William Hall Gage  Vice-Admiral of the United Kingdom
Admiral Sir Francis William Austen 
General Sir James Douglas 
General Sir George Scovell 
General the Lord Downes 
Admiral Sir Thomas John Cochrane 
Admiral Sir George Francis Seymour 

Army
General Sir Frederick Stovin 
General Sir James Fergusson  
Lieutenant-General Sir John Bell

Knight Commander of the Order of the Bath (KCB)

Military Division
Royal Navy
Vice-Admiral Arthur Fanshawe 
Vice-Admiral Provo William Parry Wallis
Rear-Admiral Robert Lambert Baynes 

Army
General the Honourable Henry Murray 
Lieutenant-General Philip Bainbrigge 
Lieutenant-General Thomas Erskine Napier 
Lieutenant-General the Honourable Charles Gore 
Lieutenant-General Edward Charles Whinyates 
Lieutenant-General George Judd Harding 

Royal Marines
Lieutenant-General Samuel Burdon Ellis

Civil Division
Indian Service
Frederick James Halliday, late Lieutenant-Governor of Bengal
Sir Robert North Collie Hamilton  late Political Agent in Central India
Major-General Richard James Holwell Birch  Secretary to the Government of India in the Military Department
Colonel Peter Melvill Melvill, Secretary to the Government of Bombay in the Military and Naval Departments
Lieutenant-Colonel Herbert Benjamin Edwardes  Commissioner of Peshawur

Companion of the Order of the Bath (CB)

Civil Division
Thomas Erskine May, Clerk Assistant of the House of Commons

Colonial Service
Philip Edmond Wodehouse, Governor and Commander-in-Chief in and over the Colony of British Guiana
James Walker, Colonial Secretary for the Island of Barbados
Colonel Stephen John Hill, Captain-General and Governor-in-Chief in and over the Colony of Sierra Leone
Edward Jordan, President of the Privy Council of the Island of Jamaica
Major Mathew Richmond, sometime Superintendent at Wellington and Nelson, in New Zealand

Indian Service
Edward Anderton Reade, Bengal Civil Service, Member of the Sudder Board of Revenue
Donald Friell McLeod, Bengal Civil Service, Financial Commissioner, Punjab
John Cracroft Wilson, Bengal Civil Service, Judge of Moradabad
Edward Thornton, Bengal Civil Service, Commissioner of the Jhelum Division, Punjab
Henry Carre Tucker, Bengal Civil Service, Commissioner of Benares
George Udny Yule, Bengal Civil Service, Commissioner of Bhaugulpore
Edward Alexander Samuells, Bengal Civil Service, Commissioner of Patna
Robert Alexander, Bengal Civil Service, Commissioner of Rohilcund
Frederick Bebb Gubbins, Bengal Civil Service, Commissioner of Benares
Arthur Austin Roberts, Bengal Civil Service, Commissioner of Lahore
George Carnac Barnes, Bengal Civil Service, Commissioner of the Cis-Sutlej States
Arthur Herbert Cocks, Bengal Civil Service, Judge of Mynpoorie
Charles John Wingfield, Bengal Civil Service, Commissioner of Goruckpore
Samuel Wauchope, Bengal Civil Service, Commissioner of Police, Calcutta
Brand Sapte, Bengal Civil Service, Magistrate of Boluridshuhur
Alonzo Money, Bengal Civil Service, Magistrate of Shahabad and Gya
Francis Otway Mayne, Bengal Civil Service, Magistrate of Banda
George Ebenezer Wilson Couper, Bengal Civil Service, Secretary to the Chief Commissioner, Oude
Robert Henry Dunlop, Bengal Civil Service, Magistrate of Meerut
William Ashburner Forbes, Bengal Civil Service, Deputy Commissioner, Oude
Frederick Henry Cooper, Bengal Civil Service, Deputy Commissioner, Umritsur
George Henry Mildmay Ricketts, Bengal Civil Service, Deputy Commissioner, Loodianah
John Henry Bax, Bengal Civil Service, Joint Magistrate, Ghazeepore
Thomas Douglas Forsyth, Bengal Civil Service, Deputy Commissioner, Umballah
Allan Octavian Hume, Bengal Civil Service, Magistrate of Etawah
Herwald Craufurd Wake, Bengal Civil Service, Magistrate of Shahabad
Brigadier-General George St. Patrick Lawrence, Bengal Cavalry, Agent to Her Majesty's Viceroy and Governor-General of India in Rajpootana
Colonel Sir Richard Campbell Shakespear  Bengal Artillery, Resident at Baroda
Lieutenant-Colonel Cuthbert Davidson, Bengal Infantry, Resident at Hyderabad
Lieutenant-Colonel Frederick Carleton Marsden, Bengal Retired List, Deputy Commissioner, Ferozepore
Major Walter Coningsby Erskine, Bengal Infantry, Commissioner of Saugor
Major John Reid Becher, Bengal Engineers, Deputy Commissioner, Hazara
Major Henry Ramsay, Bengal Infantry, Commissioner of Kumaon
Major George Walter Williams, Bengal Infantry, Commanding Meerut Volunteers
Major Richard Charles Lawrence, Bengal Infantry, Commanding the Lahore Police and Cashmere Contingent
Major John William Carnegie, Bengal Infantry, Deputy Commissioner, Oude
Major William Wilberforce Harris Greathed, Bengal Engineers
Captain Hugh Rees James, Bengal Infantry, Deputy Commissioner, Peshawur
Captain Benjamin Henderson, Bengal Infantry, Deputy Commissioner, Kohat
Robert Staunton Ellis, Madras Civil Service, Deputy Commissioner, Nagpore
Major Samuel Charters Macpherson, Madras Infantry, Political Agent, Gwalior
Major Francis Wingrave Pinkney, Madras Infantry, Commissioner of Jhansi
Captain William Hindley Crichton, Madras Infantry, Deputy Commissioner, Nagpore
Captain Charles Eliot, Madras Artillery, Deputy Commissioner, Nagpore
Lieutenant John William Willoughby Osborne, Madras Infantry, Political Agent in Rewah
John Nugent Rose, Bombay Civil Service, Chief Civil Officer, Sattara
Major William Lockyer Merewether, Bombay Infantry, Political Agent, Scinde Frontier

References

Birthday Honours
1860 awards
1860 in India
1860 in the United Kingdom